The Child Maintenance and Other Payments Act 2008 (c 6) is an Act of the Parliament of the United Kingdom. It was enacted to establish the Child Maintenance and Enforcement Commission, to amend various child support provisions, and to regulate lump-sum payments for mesothelioma victims.

References

United Kingdom Acts of Parliament 2008